Ermal Mamaqi (born 21 March 1982) is an Albanian actor, stand-up comedian, film director, screenwriter, producer, singer-songwriter, DJ and TV host.

Mamaqi is mostly known for his appearances in Portokalli (2004-2007) and Apartment 2XL (2008-2013). He is also known for hit songs that he created and performed, such as "Dita e Veres" (Summer Day), "Vetem Beso" (Just Believe), and "Ditet e Mia" (My Days).

Career
He began his acting career in 2004 in the TV show Portokalli with the group ShBLSh, when this group was the most preferred sketch in the show. After four seasons on Portokalli, ShBLSh broke up and followed their own interests.

After a year, producer Turjan Hyska called Ermal Mamaqi to join the group again in Apartment 2XL. After three seasons, the show was canceled, and the same actors, producer and TV broadcaster created the Sketch Show Albania. It aired for two seasons but did not succeed.

Mamaqi left Apartment 2XL to publish an album, but declared that he would return in the show's next season. He was the host of Dancing with the Stars Albania for two years, and will now host Kenga Magjike with Albanian presenter and singer Ardit Gjebrea. He was the TV host of 6 Dite Pa Ermalin, and now he is the TV host of Xing me Ermalin.

Personal life
Mamaqi is married to Albanian television presenter Amarda Toska. Together they have two children, a daughter and a son.

Discography

Singles

2012: "Ku ka si Tirona" ft. Dr. Flori
2013: "Do te vij te Dielen " ft. Dr. Flori
2013: "Dukesh e bukur "
2013: "Ditet e Mia"
----: "Mos harro te vish"
2012: "Bej si di "
2011: "Vetem beso" 
2012: "O gjo e eger"

Awards

Kenga Magjike

|-
||2011
||"Vetem beso tlt"
|Best Dance 
|
|-
||2012
||"Bej si di vete okej"
|Best Production
|
|}

Filmography

References

External links
 

Place of birth missing (living people)
1982 births
20th-century Albanian male actors
21st-century Albanian male actors
21st-century Albanian male singers
Albanian comedians
Albanian male film actors
Albanian male television actors
Albanian Protestants
Living people